La Más Completa Colección may refer to:

La Más Completa Colección (Jenni Rivera album)
La Más Completa Colección (Marco Antonio Solís album)
La Más Completa Colección, an album by Alberto Vázquez
La Más Completa Colección, an album by Amanda Miguel
La Más Completa Colección, an album by La Arrolladora Banda El Limón
La Más Completa Colección, an album by Los Bukis
La Más Completa Colección, an album by Chespirito
La Más Completa Colección, an album by Cristian Castro
La Más Completa Colección, an album by Control Machete
La Más Completa Colección, an album by Diego Verdaguer
La Más Completa Colección, an album by Enanitos Verdes
La Más Completa Colección, an album by Grupo Límite
La Más Completa Colección, an album by Julión Álvarez
La Más Completa Colección, an album by Kabah
La Más Completa Colección, an album by Lucero
La Más Completa Colección, an album by Mariachi Vargas de Tecalitlán
La Más Completa Colección, an album by Mercedes Sosa
La Más Completa Colección, an album by Mijares
La Más Completa Colección, an album by Miguel Ríos
La Más Completa Colección, an album by Moderatto
La Más Completa Colección, an album by Mœnia
La Más Completa Colección, an album by Nacha Pop
La Más Completa Colección, an album by Nana Mouskouri
La Más Completa Colección, an album by Onda Vaselina
La Más Completa Colección, an album by Óscar Chávez
La Más Completa Colección, an album by Pablo Milanés
La Más Completa Colección, an album by Paty Cantú
La Más Completa Colección, an album by Pedro Fernández
La Más Completa Colección, an album by Ricardo Montaner
La Más Completa Colección, an album by Rigo Tovar
La Más Completa Colección, an album by Sergio Dalma
La Más Completa Colección, an album by Tania Libertad
La Más Completa Colección, an album by Tatiana
La Más Completa Colección, Vol. 1 and Vol. 2, albums by Alejandra Guzmán
La Más Completa Colección, Vol. 1 and Vol. 2, albums by Banda El Recodo
La Más Completa Colección, Vol. 1 and Vol. 2, albums by Flans
La Más Completa Colección, Vol. 1 and Vol. 2, albums by Mijares
La Más Completa Colección, Vol. 1 and Vol. 2, albums by Thalía
La Más Completa Colección, Vol. 1 and Vol. 2, albums by Timbiriche
La Más Completa Colección, Vol. 1 and Vol. 2, albums by Víctor Yturbe
La Más Completa Colección, Vol. 1 and Vol. 2, albums by Los Yonic's